Guadua paniculata is a species of clumping bamboo found in Mexico, Panama and the tropical and sub-tropical parts of Northern South America.

This bamboo is used for rustic construction, roofing and musical instruments.

References

paniculata